My Life as a Snypa is the first album by the rap group Snypaz. It was released independently for Creative Way Records and was produced by The Legendary Traxster. Though the album did not chart, it eventually sold 80,000 copies and earned the group a record deal with Rap-a-Lot Records.

Track listing
"My Life as a Snypa"
"Faces of Death" (Wet Cho Set Mix)
"Searchin'"
"Sit Up Get Lit Up"
"Chi-Town (Til It Go Down)"
"My Life's Instrumental"

1997 debut EPs
Snypaz albums
Albums produced by The Legendary Traxster
Gangsta rap EPs